Tara Leana McKeown (born July 2, 1999) is an American professional soccer player who plays as a forward for National Women's Soccer League (NWSL) club Washington Spirit.

Club career 
McKeown was drafted by the Washington Spirit in 2021. On September 26 McKeown scored her first goal for the Spirit in a game vs Kansas City in a 2-1 victory.

References

External links 
 USC profile
 
 

Living people
1999 births
Washington Spirit players
Washington Spirit draft picks
American women's soccer players
Women's association football forwards
USC Trojans women's soccer players
United States women's under-20 international soccer players
National Women's Soccer League players